My Little Pony: Pony Life is an animated children's television series that aired on Discovery Family from November 7, 2020 to May 22, 2021. It is based on Hasbro's My Little Pony franchise. The series, acting as a successor, spin-off and reboot to 2010's My Little Pony: Friendship Is Magic and the fourth animated series based on the franchise overall, was produced by Entertainment One, in collaboration with Boulder Media. 

It has some of the writers and most of the voice cast returning from Friendship Is Magic, but it also features a different art style and a slice-of-life narrative. Unlike Friendship Is Magic, each episode is 11 minutes long, consisting of two five-minute segments. A second season for the series premiered on April 10, 2021. The series finale aired on May 22, 2021.

Premise
The main setting of Pony Life is Sugarcube Corner, a bakery operated by Pinkie Pie that she and her friends from Friendship Is Magic, Applejack, Rainbow Dash, Twilight Sparkle, Rarity and Fluttershy often use as a hangout. The series explores comedic, slice of life stories that they experience, primarily while hanging out at Sugarcube Corner. The series uses an art style based on Japanese chibi. As a reboot, it has no continuity with Friendship Is Magic. This allows for the existence of new characters such as Pinkie Pie's brother Octavio Pie, as well as the adapting out of certain other characters from the original series.

Voice cast

Main cast
With the exception of Cathy Weseluck, who voiced Spike, the main voice actors from My Little Pony: Friendship Is Magic reprise their roles in Pony Life.
 Tara Strong as Twilight Sparkle
 Ashleigh Ball as Applejack and Rainbow Dash
 Andrea Libman as Fluttershy and Pinkie Pie
 Tabitha St. Germain as Rarity and Spike

Supporting cast
 Nicole Oliver as Princess Celestia and Cheerilee
 Kyle Rideout as Dishwater Slog
 Trevor Devall as Fancy Pants
 Madeleine Peters as Scootaloo
 Michelle Creber as Apple Bloom
 Claire Corlett as Sweetie Belle
 Peter New as Discord and Big McIntosh
 Kathleen Barr as Trixie Lulamoon
 Chanelle Peloso as Potion Nova
 Lili Beaudoin as Minty
 Jesse Inocalla as Octavio Pie
 Richard Ian Cox as Snails
 Ian Hanlin as Snips
 Michael Dobson as Bulk Biceps
 Luc Roderique as Herd Happily and Curtain Call
 Peter Kelamis as Saddle Bags
 Laara Sadiq as Natalie
 Rebecca Shoichet as Twilight Sparkle (singing voice), The Pulverizer
 Britt McKillip as Princess Cadance
 Bethany Brown as Lightning Chill
 Connor Parnall as Echo
 Ana Sani as Sugar Snap
 Samuel Vincent as Flim
 Scott McNeil as Flam
 Andrew Francis as Shining Armor
 Tina Grant as Chamomilia

Episodes

Production and release
My Little Pony: Pony Life premiered on Discovery Family in the United States on November 7, 2020. Clips of several episodes have also been uploaded to the MLP YouTube channel prior to the announcement. On September 17, 2020, it was reported that a second season was in production. The second season premiered on April 10, 2021.

In Ireland, the series premiered on Tiny Pop on September 1, 2020. The second season premiered on the network on April 2, 2021.

Notes

References

External links
 Hasbro's official Pony Life profiles
 

2020s American animated television series
2020s Irish television series
2020 American television series debuts
2021 American television series endings
2020 Irish television series debuts
2021 Irish television series endings
My Little Pony television series
Television series by Entertainment One
American children's animated comedy television series
American children's animated fantasy television series
American animated television spin-offs
American flash animated television series
Animated television series about horses
Irish children's animated comedy television series
Irish children's animated fantasy television series
Irish flash animated television series
Discovery Family original programming
Animated television series reboots
English-language television shows